Reppe can refer to:
 Christiane Reppe, German Paralympian 
 Walter Reppe, German chemist
 Reppe, Territoire de Belfort, French commune